Caladenia pendens subsp. pendens, commonly known as the pendant spider orchid, is a plant in the orchid family Orchidaceae and is endemic to the south-west of Western Australia. It has a single hairy leaf and up to three relatively large, creamy-white flowers with long drooping petals and sepals and sometimes has a sickly-sweet scent.

Description
The sepals and petals have long, brown, drooping, thread-like tips. The sides of the labellum curve upwards and have short blunt teeth on their sides and the tip of the labellum curves downwards. There are two rows of cream-coloured, anvil-shaped calli along the centre of the labellum. Flowering occurs from August to early October.

Taxonomy and naming
Caladenia pendens was first described in 2001 by Stephen Hopper and Andrew Phillip Brown and the description was published in Nuytsia. At the same time they described two subspecies, including subspecies pendens.<ref name=APNI>{{cite web|title=Caladenia pendens subsp. pendens|url=https://id.biodiversity.org.au/instance/apni/574434|publisher=APNI|accessdate=2 March 2017}}</ref> The specific epithet (pendens) is a Latin word meaning "hanging" referring to the long drooping petals and lateral sepals.

Distribution and habitat
The pendant spider orchid is found between Wongan Hills and Walpole in the Avon Wheatbelt, Esperance Plains, Geraldton Sandplains, Jarrah Forest, Mallee, Swan Coastal Plain and Warren biogeographic regions. It grows in sandy soil near salt lakes and on granite outcrops.

ConservationCaladenia pendens subsp. pendens''  is classified as "not threatened" by the Western Australian Government Department of Parks and Wildlife.

References

pendens
Endemic orchids of Australia
Orchids of Western Australia
Plants described in 2001
Taxa named by Stephen Hopper
Taxa named by Andrew Phillip Brown